Inzer (İnyär) is a rural locality (a selo) and the administrative centre of Inzersky Selsoviet, Beloretsky District, Bashkortostan, Russia. The population was 4,329 as of 2010. There are 70 streets.

Geography 
Inzer is located 90 km northwest of Beloretsk (the district's administrative centre) by road. Usmangali is the nearest rural locality.

References 

Rural localities in Beloretsky District